Miss Mend (also known as The Adventures of the Three Reporters) is a 1926 Soviet spy film, originally realised in three parts, directed by and starring Boris Barnet and Fyodor Otsep. It is loosely based on the books by Marietta Shaginyan. The story follows the adventures of three reporters who try to stop a biological attack on the USSR by powerful Western businessmen.

The surviving print is just over four hours long. The film was restored by David Shepard, and released on DVD in December 2009 by Flicker Alley.

Plot

Vivian Mend (Natalya Gland), an American pro-labor activist, works as a typist for the powerful Stern family. She has three admirers: Hopkins (Igor Ilyinsky), a clerk who also works for the Sterns; Barnet (played by professional boxer turned actor Boris Barnet, who also co-directed the film), a journalist; and Fogel (Vladimir Fogel), a newspaper photographer.

They discover a plot by a band of capitalists led by the wicked Chiche (Sergei Komarov). He has organized the assassination of Mend's employer, an American millionaire named Gordon Stern, accusing the Bolsheviks of his murder in order to attack the USSR with poison gas hidden in radio equipment. Without hesitation, the quartet hop on a boat to Leningrad in hopes of stopping the nefarious scheme.

Under a falsified will, Stern's property is inherited by his maleficent second wife Elizabeth, bypassing Stern's son Arthur. She deposits a large sum of money into the bank-account of an anti-Bolshevik organization led by Chiche known as "The Organization". Arthur, accepting as truth the reputed involvement of the Communists in the death of his father, supports the financing of terrorist acts in Russia, planned by Chiche.

Formally testament reversal may be appealed. He has an illegitimate child - John, the son of the sister Viviane, whose existence is to know Arthur. Child kidnapped people Chiche, but forced to release at the request of Arthur for help that asked Vivian, taking his technique Johnson, whose name he called when meeting.

The Russian engineer Berg rides. Friends become aware of plans Čiče eliminate it and send it on a trip made up as Arthur Berg, replacing engineer their luggage boxes with lethal vial.

Vivienne came for John to the police station, but the boy died, biting the poisoned apple, which gave him with them before releasing the villain Chiche. The children's jacket pocket police found a business card Reversal Arthur and Vivien is convinced that he is guilty of the death of his brother.

Chiche and Arthur sat on the boat going to Leningrad. On the eve of the arrival in the port of destination they kill Berg and, following a predetermined plan, in its place appears disguised Storn. On the trail of criminals are Vivienne friends, but in Leningrad they neutralize Chiche and forward them to a rented house on the outskirts of the city.

Vivienne continues to take over the machinery of Arthur Johnson and unwittingly disclose his participation in the capture of maniacal madman. Barnet learns Arthur Johnson in Reversal, and Vivienne can only regret admitted missteps.

Vogel manages to inform about the action of police officers. Arthur learns from her stepmother about the role played in his father's death Chiche, and commits suicide. After shooting and breakneck chase and killed the leader of the bandits, trying to escape through the mine existing elevator.

Cast

 Natalia Glan - Vivian Mend, secretary
 Boris Barnet - Barnet Champion, tabloid-press reporter 
 Vladimir Fogel - Vogel, press-photographer
 Igor Ilyinsky - Tom Hopkins, clerk
 Ivan Koval-Samborski - Arthur Stern
 Sergey Komarov -Chiche
 Peter Repnin - bandit
  - Elizabeth Stern
 Vladimir Ural - policeman
 Dmitri Kapka - passenger
 Mikhail Zharov - 
 Michael Rosen Sanin - 
 Tatiana Mukhina - homeless Kolka
 Anel Sudakevich - stenographer
 Irina Volodko - 
 P. Poltoratsky - 
 S. Goetz - John, Vivian's nephew

References

External links
 

 Dave Kehr (11 December 2009) "DVDS: All-American Soviet Heroine", The New York Times
 "Miss Mend (1926) A Silent Film Review" (3 February 2013) Movies Silently

1926 films
Soviet black-and-white films
1920s spy films
1920s science fiction films
Soviet silent feature films
Soviet science fiction films
Films directed by Boris Barnet
Films directed by Fedor Ozep
Films set in the United States
Soviet spy films
Soviet crime films
Films about the Soviet Union in the Stalin era
Films about chemical war and weapons
Films set in Saint Petersburg
Silent war films
Silent science fiction films